The Hornsey by-election of 30 May 1957 was held after the death of Conservative Party MP David Gammans.

The seat was safe, having been won at the 1955 United Kingdom general election by over 12,500 votes

Result of the previous general election

Result of the by-election

References

Hornsey,1957
Hornsey by-election
Hornsey by-election
By-election, 1957
Hornsey,1957
Hornsey